Marnix ten Kortenaar (born 19 August 1970) is an Austrian speed skater. He competed in three events at the 1998 Winter Olympics.

References

External links
 

1970 births
Living people
Austrian male speed skaters
Olympic speed skaters of Austria
Speed skaters at the 1998 Winter Olympics
Sportspeople from Voorburg